Laura Grimaldi (1928 – 3 July 2012) was an Italian writer, journalist and translator from English.

Life
Grimaldi was born in Rufina near Florence in 1928. Her family soon moved to Milan.

She became known for her translations of notable authors writing in English. The hundreds of books she translated included works by Ray Bradbury, Raymond Chandler, Agatha Christie, Philip K. Dick, Ernest Hemingway and Ellery Queen.

Grimaldi wrote crime novels and her publisher called her the "Queen of Crime" citing her work in the 1950s. Her novels include Suspicion. Her stories are set in Milan. She received the Prix du Polar Européen in 2003 by her work La Colpa. She was a director of the company Interno Giallo.

Grimaldi died in Milan in 2012.

References

1928 births
2012 deaths
20th-century Italian translators
20th-century Italian writers
20th-century Italian women writers
Rufina